Caroline Rosa Wickham-Jones FSA (25 April 1955 – 13 January 2022) was a British archaeologist specialising in Stone Age Orkney. She was a lecturer at the University of Aberdeen until her retirement in 2015.

Life and career 
Wickham-Jones was born in Stockton-on-Tees, England, on 25 April 1955. She studied archaeology at the University of Edinburgh and obtained a master's degree in Heritage Management from the University of Birmingham. From 2006 to 2015, she was lecturer in archaeology at the University of Aberdeen. Her research at Aberdeen, supported by the Leverhulme Trust, focused on the submerged landscape of Orkney around Scapa Flow. As a specialist on the Mesolithic, she collaborated on the University of Aberdeen's 'Rising Tide' project and the University of the Highlands and Islands' 'Turning Back the Tide' project.  She saw the role of archaeological work in contributing to wider discussions about responses to climate change. She felt that understanding how our ancestors lived held important “keys to our continued existence”. She also helped establish the Mesolithic Room at the Tomb of the Eagles Museum on Orkney.

Wickham-Jones also held a visiting research fellowship at the University of the Highlands and Islands and was an honorary research assistant at the University of Aberdeen at the time of her death. She was a trustee of the John Muir Trust, the Orkney Archaeological Trust, and Caithness Archaeological Trust; a fellow of the Society of Antiquaries of London and an honorary fellow of the Society of Antiquaries of Scotland; and a member of the Chartered Institute for Archaeologists.

She died from amyloidosis caused by cancer on 13 January 2022, at the age of 66.

Selected publications 

Individual Publications:

 2019; Landscape beneath the waves: the archaeological investigation of underwater landscapes. Oxford: Oxbow Books.
 2019; Seamless archaeology: the use of archaeology in the study of seascapes. In King, T. & Robinson, G. At Home on the Waves. New York: Berghahn books.
 2014; Prehistoric hunter-gatherer innovations: coastal adaptions. In Cummings, V., P. Jordan & M. Zvelebil. (eds.) The Oxford Handbook of the Archaeology and Anthropology of Hunter- gatherers. Oxford: Oxford University Press, 694–711.
 2012; The Monuments of Orkney. Edinburgh: Historic Scotland.
 2010; Fear of Farming. Oxford: Oxbow Books/Windgather Press.
 2006; Between the Water and the Wind, World Heritage Orkney, Windgather Press (revised and republished in 2015)
 2001;The Landscape of Scotland: a hidden history, Gloucester: Tempus. (republished by The History Press: Feb 2009)
 1998; Orkney, an historical guide; Edinburgh: Birlinn Press. (reprinted and updated in 2007; revised edition published in 2015, reprinted 2017, 2018 and 2019)
 1993; A round bottomed vessel from a new archaeological site at Papadil, Rum;Glasgow Archaeol J; 18;73-5
 1987; A discoidal flint knife from near Huntly, Aberdeenshire; Proc Soc Antiq Scot; 117; 1986–7; 354–5.
 1986; The Procurement and Use Of Stone For Flaked Tools in Prehistoric Scotland; Proc Soc Antiq Scot; 116; 1- 10.

Joint Publications:

 Barclay GJ, Carter SP, Dalland MM, Hastie M, Holden TG, MacSween A, & Wickham-Jones CR, 2002, A Possible Neolithic Settlement at Kinbeachie, Easter Ross. Proceedings of the Society of Antiquaries of Scotland, 131 (2001) 57–86.
 Ballin, T. B. and Wickham-Jones, C.R. 2017. Searching for the Scottish Late Upper Palaeolithic: a case study from Nethermills Farm, Aberdeenshire. Journal of Lithic Studies, 4, 1–15.
 Bates CR, Bates M, Dawson S, Huws D, Whittaker JE, and Wickham-Jones CR 2016, The Environmental context of the Neolithic Monuments on the Brodgar Isthmus, Mainland, Orkney. Journal of Archaeological Science: Reports, 7, 394–407.
 Bates M, Nayling N, Bates CR, Dawson S, Huws D, & Wickham-Jones CR 2013 A multi-disciplinary approach to the archaeological investigation of a bedrock dominated shallow marine landscape: an example from the Bay of Firth, Orkney, UK. International Journal of Nautical Archaeology, 42.
 Cucchi T, R Barnett, N Martínková, S Renaud, E Renvoisé, A Evin, A Sheridan, I Mainland, CR Wickham- Jones, C Tougard, JP Quéré, M Pascal, M Pascal, G Heckel, P O’Higgins, JB Searle & KM Dobney; 2014. The changing pace of insular life: 5000 years of microevolution in the Orkney vole (Microtus arvalis orcadensis), Evolution, 68/10, 2804–2820.
 Elphinstone M & Wickham-Jones CR 2012 Archaeology and Fiction Antiquity, 86, 532–537.
 Wickham-Jones CR, Dawson S & Bates CR 2009, The Submerged Landscape of Orkney. Archaeological Journal, 166 (supplement: Orkney guide), 26–30.
 Wickham-Jones CR & Firth CR 2000; Mesolithic settlement of northern Scotland: first results of fieldwork in Caithness and Orkney, in Young R (ed) Mesolithic Lifeways, current research from Britain and Ireland, Leicester: Leicester Archaeology Monographs no 7, 119–32.
 Wickham-Jones CR & Woodman P 1998; Studies on the Early Settlement of Scotland and Ireland; in Strauss L & Ericksen B (eds); As the World Warmed, Human Adaptions Across the Pleistocene/Holocene Boundary; (= Quaternary International 49/50); 13–20. Oxford: Pergamon.

References 

1955 births
2022 deaths
Scottish archaeologists
British women archaeologists
Prehistorians
Alumni of the University of Edinburgh
Alumni of the University of Birmingham
Academics of the University of Aberdeen
Academics of the University of the Highlands and Islands
People from Kirkwall
Climate activists